Akragas may refer to:

 Akragas, an ancient Greek city on the site of modern Agrigento, Sicily
 Acragas (mythology), son of Zeus and the Oceanid Asterope in Greek mythology
 Acragas, one of the Potamoi
 Acragas (silversmith), an engraver or chaser in silver, mentioned by Pliny the Elder
 S.S. Akragas Città dei Templi, commonly referred to as S.S. Akragas, an Italian association football club based in Agrigento, Sicily